kwaNgwanase, also known as Kosi Bay Town, is a small town in Umkhanyakude District Municipality in the KwaZulu-Natal province of South Africa. It is located some 15 km south of the Mozambique–South Africa border, and is situated near Kosi Bay.

Communications
The Manguzi Wireless Internet is a project that provides Internet access, e-mail and learning
resources to schools where no telecommunications infrastructure exists utilising a unique combination of radio and satellite broadcasting technologies.

Healthcare
Manguzi Hospital, founded by the Methodist Church in 1948, is a 280-bed District (level 1) hospital, managed by the KwaZulu-Natal Department of Health.

References

Populated places in the Umhlabuyalingana Local Municipality